Ugo Gregoretti (28 September 1930 – 5 July 2019) was an Italian film, television and stage director, actor, screenwriter, author and television host. He directed 20 films during his career.

Biography
Born in Rome, Gregoretti entered RAI in 1953, working as a documentarist and a director.  In 1960 he won the Premio Italia Award for the television documentary La Sicilia del Gattopardo. In 1962 he made his film debut with the comedy-drama I nuovi angeli. Since 1978 he started his activity on stage as director of prose and opera representations. His activity as director was mainly characterized by a sensitivity to the political and social issues combined to a peculiar use of irony and satire.  He was president of the Turin Permanent Theatre from 1980 to 1989 and in 1995 he was nominated president of the Accademia Nazionale di Arte Drammatica Silvio D'Amico. In 2010 he was awarded with a special Lifetime Nastro d'Argento for his career.

Filmography
 I nuovi angeli (1962)
 Ro.Go.Pa.G. (1963)
 Omicron (1963)
 Les plus belles escroqueries du monde (1964)
 Beautiful Families (1964)
Apollon: una fabbrica occupata (1969)
Contratto (1970)
Antifascisti a Roma (1972)
Vietnam, scene dal dopoguerra (1975)
Oltre la guerra, ad Hanoi (1975)
Dentro Roma (1976)
 La terrazza (only acting, 1980)
Comunisti quotidiani (1980)
Sabatoventiquattrimarzo (1984)
 It's Happening Tomorrow (only acting, 1988)
  (1990)
La primavera del 2002 - l’Italia protesta, l’Italia si ferma (2002)
Scossa (2011)
Io, il tubo e la pizza (unreleased, 2017)

References

External links

1930 births
2019 deaths
Italian film directors
Italian male film actors
Italian screenwriters
Italian male screenwriters
Nastro d'Argento winners